James Morton Sims (13 May 1903 – 27 April 1973) was an English cricketer.

Jim Sims represented Middlesex in 381 first-class matches between 1929 and 1952 as a right-handed batsman and off-break bowler who scored 7173 runs (highest score 121) and took 1,257 wickets (best bowling 9/92). He later coached and scored for the county.

He played in four Tests for England from 1935 to 1937.

He succeeded Jim Alldis as the Middlesex scorer in 1969. He continued in this role until his sudden death from a heart attack in 1973.

1903 births
1973 deaths
Cricket scorers
England Test cricketers
English cricketers
Middlesex cricketers
People from Leyton
Marylebone Cricket Club cricketers
Players cricketers
North v South cricketers
East of England cricketers
Cricketers who have taken ten wickets in an innings
English cricketers of 1919 to 1945
Sir T. E. W. Brinckman's XI cricketers
Marylebone Cricket Club Australian Touring Team cricketers